Doobidoo is a Swedish musical game show first aired on 26 August 2005 on the public service network SVT. There is also a Polish, TVP2, version called Dubidu - show host 
Piotr Gasowski 
- and an Australian version that goes by You may be right, hosted by
Todd McKenney

The Swedish version of the show is hosted by entertainment personality Lasse Kronér. The show has (2020) run for 15 seasons.

See also 
Diggiloo
Så ska det låta

References

Sveriges Television original programming
Swedish music television series
Swedish game shows